Bang or bangs may refer to:

Products 
 M1922 Bang rifle, a US semi-automatic rifle designed by Søren Hansen Bang
 Bang, a model car brand
 Bang (beverage), an energy drink

Geography
 Bang, Lorestan, a village in Iran
 Bangs, Ohio, United States
 Bangs, Texas, United States

People 
 Bang (surname)
 Bangs (surname)
 Bang, pseudonym of Barbro Alving (1909-1987), Swedish journalist
Stage name for Bae "Bang" Jun-sik, professional League of Legends player for Evil Geniuses

Print media
 Bang!, a 2005 young adult novel by Sharon G. Flake
 Bang: The Pickup Bible That Helps You Get More Lays, a 2007 book by Roosh V
 Bang, a character in the manga series One-Punch Man
 Bay Area News Group (BANG), the largest newspaper publisher in the San Francisco Bay Area

Magazines
 Bang (magazine), founded 1991, Swedish magazine
 The Bang (Vagabonds), 1907-1917, the weekly magazine of the Vagabonds (National Arts Club)

Film and television
 Bang (TV series), a bilingual crime drama TV series from Wales
 Bang (film), a 1997 American film
 Bang! (film), a 1977 Swedish film
 "Bang" (Desperate Housewives)
 "Bang" (The Good Wife)
 "Bang" (Harper's Island)
 "Bang" (The Shield)
 "Bangs", an episode of "The Protector"
 Bang Cartoon, a website

Games
 Bang! (card game)
 Bang! (arcade game)
 Bang! (drama game), a game involving imaginary guns
 Bang! (video game)
 Bang Shishigami, a BlazBlue character

Music
 Bang! (opera), by John Rutter
 Bang Records, a record label
 Bang! Records, a record label
 Bang (company), a music and sound production company from NYC

Groups and musicians
 Bang (Greek band), a Greek pop music group
 Bang (American band), a hard rock group
 Bang! (band), a British happy hardcore group
 Bangs (band), an American punk rock group
 Bangs (hip hop artist) (born 1992), South Sudanese-Australian hip hop artist
 The Bang, a South African band
 Bang, former bass player for Stars Underground and Astrovamps

Albums
 Bang! (1985 Frankie Goes to Hollywood album)
 Bang (Anitta album), 2015
 Bang (Chief Keef album), 2011
 Bang (James Gang album), 1973
 Bang (The Jesus Lizard album), 2000
 Bang (Rockapella album), 2002
 Bang! (Cinema Bizarre album), 2009
 Bang! (Corey Hart album), 1990
 Bang! (Gotthard album) and its title track, 2014
 Bang! (Thunder album), 2008
 Bang! (World Party album), 1993
 Bang!... The Greatest Hits of Frankie Goes to Hollywood, 1993

EPs
 Bang (Rita Ora and Imanbek EP), 2021
 Bang, 2007 EP by Nightmare of You
 Bang! (EP), 1997 EP by the Goo Goo Dolls

Songs
 "Bang" (Anitta song), 2015
 "Bang" (Blur song), 1991
 "Bang" (Gorky Park song), 1989
 "Bang" (Rye Rye song), featuring M.I.A., 
 "Bang!" (After School song), 2011
 "Bang!" (AJR song), 2020
Bang (Conway the Machine song), 2019
 "Bang", a song by Waka Flocka Flame featuring YG Hootie & Slim Dunkin on the album Flockaveli
 "Bang", a song by Dave Dee, Dozy, Beaky, Mick & Tich from the album If Music Be the Food of Love... Prepare for Indigestion
 "Bang", a song by Yeah Yeah Yeahs from the EP Yeah Yeah Yeahs
 "Bang", a song by Badmarsh & Shri from the album Signs
 "Bang!", a song by The Raveonettes from the album In and Out of Control
 "Bangs", a song by They Might Be Giants on the album Mink Car

Other uses
!Bang, a search syntax used by search engine DuckDuckGo
 !Bang!, a professional wrestling promotion
 Bang (Korean), a room or building
 Bangs (hair), the part of the hair overhanging the forehead
 Bang's disease
 Exclamation mark (!), a punctuation symbol sometimes called a "bang"
Interrobang (‽), a nonstandard punctuation mark intended to combine the functions of the question mark and the exclamation mark (the latter is known in printers' and programmers' jargon as a "bang")
 An onomatopoeia, specifically a word that imitates the sound of an explosion or gunshot, like in comics
 Slang for an explosion
 Slang for "to have sex with"

See also
 BANG file, a point access method
 Bang path, a type of e-mail address
 Banging (disambiguation)
 Bhang, an edible preparation of cannabis
 Bang Bang (disambiguation)
 Big Bang (disambiguation)
 "Not with a bang but a whimper", quote from T.S. Eliot